Rushen Abbey is a former abbey on the Isle of Man, located in Ballasalla. Originally home for monks of the Savignac order, it soon came under Cistercian control and remained so until its dissolution. Both these sites are on the Awin Rosien, a river now called the Silver Burn.

History

The abbey was founded in 1134, under Óláfr Guðrøðarson's control. He granted the land to Savignac monks from Furness Abbey. In 1147 the abbey came under Cistercian rule following the merging of the Savignac and Cistercian orders. The abbey church dedicated to St Mary was completed in 1257. The abbey was dissolved in the 16th century.
 
In 1853 the Isle of Man Government bought Rushen Abbey with the intention of turning it into a lunatic asylum, but it was never used for such a purpose, and in 1864 an Act was passed revoking the sale.

In the early 1900s, the abbey ruins became a popular tourist destination, famous for the strawberries and cream served in its gardens. After falling into disrepair after World War II, the abbey was acquired by Manx National Heritage in May 1998, and restorations have now been made. Soon afterwards, excavations began, and archaeologists discovered more about the monks' way of life and practices.

The abbey is now a heritage centre (part of the "Story of Mann") with a building containing artefacts and telling the history of Rushen Abbey and the surrounding area. The remains of the original abbey have been restored and walkways constructed to allow visitors to get a close look. Between April and October the abbey is open to the public and an admission fee is payable. Before accessing the abbey gardens, visitors must walk through a museum that explains the role of the abbey. There is interactive, audio and video material available. At the end of the exhibition, there is an area designed for children, allowing them to build an arch and discover the monastery's history in a way that is more appealing to them. The centre is advertised to children with the phrase "Monky business".

The Chronicle of Mann was compiled at Rushen Abbey, as were many other important documents relating to the island. The abbey is significant in this respect, as it would have been the centre of knowledge and literacy on the island.

Monks' Bridge 

Monks from Rushen Abbey would sometimes have farms in the north of the island. A packhorse bridge was built in around 1350 to allow the monks to cross the nearby Silverburn River. Known today as The Monks' Bridge (or The Crossag), it is one of few surviving packhorse bridges in the British Isles.

Burials
Olaf the Black
Magnús Óláfsson
Rǫgnvaldr Óláfsson

References

External links 

 Rushen Abbey  Centre for Manx Studies page about the abbey
 Rushen Abbey Information from Manx National Heritage
 Information about Rushen Abbey 

Religious organizations established in the 1130s
Tourist attractions in the Isle of Man
Cistercian monasteries in the United Kingdom
Christian monasteries established in the 12th century
Burial sites of the Crovan dynasty
Roman Catholic monasteries in the Isle of Man
Monasteries dissolved under the English Reformation